Ilybius gagates is a species of predaceous diving beetle in the family Dytiscidae. It is found in North America.

References

Further reading

 
 

gagates
Articles created by Qbugbot
Beetles described in 1838